Alpha,N,O-TMS, or α,N-dimethyl-5-methoxytryptamine, is a lesser-known psychedelic drug.  Its abbreviated nomenclature is derived from its structure, as it is α,N,O-trimethyl serotonin. α,N,O-TMS was first synthesized by Alexander Shulgin. In his book TiHKAL (Tryptamines I Have Known and Loved), Shulgin lists the dosage as 10-20 mg when taken orally, and the duration as 6–8 hours.

References

External links
 α,N,O-TMS Entry in TIHKAL
 α,N,O-TMS Entry in TiHKAL • info

Psychedelic tryptamines